Blow's Down is a  biological Site of Special Scientific Interest in Dunstable in Bedfordshire. It was notified in 1989 under Section 28 of the Wildlife and Countryside Act 1981, and the local planning authority is Central Bedfordshire Council. The site forms around half of the  Blow's Downs nature reserve, which is managed by the Wildlife Trust for Bedfordshire, Cambridgeshire and Northamptonshire.

The site has varied habitats with a large area of unimproved grassland, a scarce survival of this important habitat. Cattle help to maintain the pasture. Features include a disused quarry and medieval cultivation terraces. It has a rare plant, Bunium bulbocastanum, and beetle odontaeus armiger.

There is access from Jardine Way and Half Moon Lane.

References

Sites of Special Scientific Interest in Bedfordshire
Wildlife Trust for Bedfordshire, Cambridgeshire and Northamptonshire reserves